Afyon Kocatepe Stadyumu, officially known as Zafer Stadyumu, is a stadium in Afyonkarahisar, Turkey. It opened on 21 July 2015 and it has a capacity of 15,000 spectators. It was the new home of Afyonkarahisarspor of the Turkish Regional Amateur League. Currently it's the home of Afjet Afyonspor. It replaced the club's Afyon Atatürk Stadium.

References

Football venues in Turkey
Sports venues completed in 2015
Sports venues in Afyonkarahisar
Buildings and structures in Turkey
2015 establishments in Turkey